The Cyprus State Archives are the national archives of Cyprus.  They depend upon the ministry of justice and public order.  They were established in 1972. They are based in Nicosia.

See also
 National Library of Cyprus

External links 
 Official website

National archives
Cypriot culture
Archives in Cyprus